Puiu Manu (born September 14, 1928 in Bucharest) is a Romanian graphic designer and comic book creator.

References

1928 births
Artists from Bucharest
21st-century Romanian artists
20th-century Romanian artists
Living people